Malerkotla is a city and district headquarters of Malerkotla district in the Indian state of Punjab. It was the seat of the eponymous princely state during the British Raj. The state acceded to the union of India in 1947 and was merged with other nearby princely states to create the Patiala and East Punjab States Union (PEPSU).

When that political entity was reorganised in 1956, the territories of the erstwhile state of Malerkotla became part of Punjab.
It is located on the Sangrur-Ludhiana State Highway (no. 11) and lies on the secondary Ludhiana-Delhi railway line.

In 2021, the city along with some adjoining areas were carved out of Sangrur district to form the Malerkotla district.

History 

Malerkotla, a Muslim majority state was established in 1454 by Sheikh Sadruddin-i-Jahan from Afghanistan, and was ruled by his Sherwani descendants. The State of Malerkotla was established in 1600 A.D. During the 1947 riots when Punjab was experiencing heavy amounts of communal violence, the State of Malerkotla remained relatively peaceful.

The roots of communal harmony date back to 1705, when Zorawar Singh and Fateh Singh  9 and 7 year old sons of tenth Sikh Guru, Guru Gobind Singh, were ordered to be bricked alive by the governor of Sirhind Wazir Khan. While his close relative, Sher Mohammed Khan, Nawab of Malerkotla, who was present in the court, lodged a vehement protest against this act and said it was against the tenets of the Quran and Islam. Wazir Khan nevertheless had the boys bricked into a section of wall whilst still alive. At this, the Nawab of Malerkotla walked out of the court in protest. Guru Gobind Singh on learning of this approach had blessed the Nawab and the people of Malerkotla that the city will live in the peace and happiness. In recognition of this act, the State of Malerkotla did not suffer significantly during the Partition of India, in which communal violence permeated throughout Punjab.

Under British colonial rule, a Namdhari uprising was suppressed, and the colonial government ordered execution of 65 captured rebels and those thought to be involved with the rebellion. Cowan (the Deputy Commissioner of Ludhiana) and Forsyth (the Commissioner of Ambala) ordered the Namdharis to be executed with cannons, without any trial, on 17 and 18 January 1872.

During the partition of India, there were no riots or bloodshed in any part of Maler Kotla State. The last Nawab Iftikhar Ali Khan of Malerkotla maintained calm and harmony during the turbulent period. He remained in India and died in the year 1982. His tomb is located in Shahi grave yard situated at Sirhandi gate, Maler Kotla. Many also attribute this peace to the presence of the shrine of Baba Haidar Sheikh, the Sufi saint, who founded the town of Malerkotla more than 500 years ago.

A part of the ruling family of Sheikh Sadr-ud-Din Sherwani migrated to Pakistan and lived mostly in Model Town, Lahore, Muzzafargarh, Khangarh.

Malerkotla is famous for its vegetables and badge-making industry, besides its poets and monuments.

Demographics

As per provisional data of 2011 census Malerkotla urban agglomeration had a population of 189,424, out of which males were 82,376 and females were 64,048 . The literacy rate was 70.25 per cent.

Malerkotla is the only Muslim-majority city of Punjab.

Education 

Urdu is taught alongside Punjabi in Malerkotla schools due to the local Punjabi Muslim majority. 

Nawab Sher Mohammad Khan Institute of Advanced Studies in Urdu, Persian and Arabic is part of Punjabi University, Patiala, and is named after one of the founders of Malerkotla State. It provides facilities for higher research in the languages and literature of Urdu and Persian up to PhD level and additionally runs classes for M.A. (Persian), Certificate courses (Urdu, Persian and Arabic), MSc (IT) two years, MSc (IT) lateral entry, PGDCA (one year), CCA (six months) and M.A (psychology). 

There are many schools and institutes including Learning Cottage Of Commerce. There are other schools like Sohrab Public Senior Secondary School, Al Falah Public senior secondary School, the town school, Sahibzada Fateh Singh senior secondary public school, Sita grammar school, Sarvhitkari Vidya Mandir,  Modern Secular school, DAV public school and many more.
Almighty Public School on Almighty School road, Jamalpura, Malerkotla is a co-education, English Medium Sr. Secondary School. This school provide Education about Islam for Muslim students.

Transportation

Rail
Malerkotla is situated on Delhi-Jakhal-Dhuri-Ludhiana Railway line. The nearest railway junctions are Dhuri and Ludhiana ).

Air
The nearest airports to Malerkotla are:

Notable residents  

Iftikhar Ali Khan of Malerkotla (Last Nawab of Malerkotla)
Anas Rashid (Indian television actor) 
Irshad Kamil (Indian lyricist and poet) 
Mohammad Nazim (Indian television actor) 
Razia Sultana (politician) (Indian Politician)
Saeed Jaffrey (Indian actor) 
Ahmad Ali Khan of Malerkotla (Malerkotla Nawab)
Channi Singh (Indian musician)
Zeenat Begum (Pakistani singer) 
Bobby Jindal (American politician, 55th Governor of Louisiana)
Mohammad Sajid Dhot (Indian footballer)

Gallery

References

Further reading 
 Kinship and the Political Order: The Afghan Sherwani Chiefs of Malerkotla (1454–1947), Contributions to Indian Sociology, Vol. 28, No. 2, 203–241 (1994).

External links

Cities and towns in Malerkotla district